The Afghan Ministry of Transport and Civil Aviation is the Afghan Government Ministry in charge of the management of air and ground transportation, operation of airports and the national airline, as well as numerous other state-owned enterprises engaged in the transport business.  the minister is Hamidullah Akhundzada.

It is headquartered in Ansari Watt, Kabul.

When, after the fall of the Taliban, the Bonn Conference installed an interim government for Afghanistan, the government had one minister for Transport and one minister for Civil Aviation & Tourism. In 2004, when after the Presidential Election the newly elected President Hamid Karzai his cabinet formed, the post of minister for Civil Aviation & Tourism was abolished. The minister of Transport became responsible for Civil Aviation and the Minister of Information and culture became responsible for Tourism.

Under the Taliban, the ministry has outsourced operation of Afghanistan's airspace and airports to the United Arab Emirates firm GAAC Holding.

Ministers

References

External links

  
 Official Website Ministry of Transportation & Civil Aviation 
 Official Website Ministry of Transportation & Civil Aviation 
Flight Information Region In Afghanistan

Transportation and Civil Aviation
Afghanistan
Civil aviation in Afghanistan
Transport organisations based in Afghanistan